The Azzabas madhhab is one of the schools of Islamic law in Ibadism. The Ibadi school was founded between the years 1286 and 1386 and is mainly centered in the Maghreb region. In practice, Azzabas promotes a system of collectivism rather than individualism. Decisions earmarked by the Azzabas were conducted within a council, whose members attained their positions via consultations, and its rulings derive from a varied number of sources.

References

Ibadi Islam
Islamic law
Madhhab
Islamic jurisprudence
Maghreb